The mixed 50 metre rifle three positions shooting competition at the 1980 Summer Olympics was held on 23 July at the Dynamo Shooting Range in Moscow, USSR. The gold medal went to Soviet Viktor Vlasov, who broke the world record with 1,173.

Results

References

Shooting at the 1980 Summer Olympics
Men's 050m 3 positions 1980